Andria King (born June 22, 1976, in Atlanta, Georgia) is a retired American athlete who specialized in the 100 meters hurdles. She won the gold medal at the 1999 Summer Universiade. She also represented her country at the 1999 World Championships reaching the quarterfinals.

She has personal bests of 12.86 seconds in the 100 meters hurdles (Atlanta 1999) and 8.00 seconds in the 60 meters hurdles (Atlanta 1999).

She now works as an assistant track and field coach at the Georgia Institute of Technology.

Competition record

References

1976 births
Living people
Track and field athletes from Atlanta
American female hurdlers
World Athletics Championships athletes for the United States
Pan American Games track and field athletes for the United States
Athletes (track and field) at the 1999 Pan American Games
Universiade medalists in athletics (track and field)
Universiade gold medalists for the United States
Medalists at the 1999 Summer Universiade
21st-century American women